The Maritime e-Commerce Association (or MeCA) is a not-for-profit group of marine business and technical experts in the UK who are collectively committed to speeding up the process of marine-related business transactions through the development of application-to-application interoperability standards.

MeCA promotes e-commerce for the benefit of all parties in the marine supply-chain, including ship owners/managers, suppliers and software providers. It does this by developing, maintaining, harmonising and promoting common standards (including technical standards and protocols for interoperability between systems).

Founded in December 1999, MeCA has developed its own XML based standard, called MTML (Marine Trading Mark-up Language) derived from IMPA's ETSF EDIFACT standard. It has widespread support throughout the maritime buyer and supplier community as well as with marine supply chain software providers. The latest version is MTML Version 2.0. This support includes close relationships with IMPA (International Marine Purchasing Association) and ISSA (International Ship Suppliers Association).

The Maritime e-Commerce Association was responsible for developing the maritime industry’s first XML based communications standard, called MTML (Marine Trading Mark-up Language).
Shipserv and SpecTec were one of the founding members of MeCA.

External links
 MeCA home page

E-commerce in the United Kingdom
Non-profit organisations based in the United Kingdom